Desert hairy scorpion can refer to the following scorpion species in the genus Hadrurus:

Giant desert hairy scorpion (H. arizonensis)
Northern desert hairy scorpion (H. spadix)

Animal common name disambiguation pages